John McMaster (26 June 1830 – 29 February 1924) was an alderman and mayor of Brisbane, Queensland, Australia. He was a Member of the Legislative Assembly of Queensland and a Member of the Legislative Council of Queensland.

Personal life
John McMaster was born in 1830 in Argyllshire, Scotland, the son of John McMaster and Isabella White. On 9 April 1854 he married Catherine McInnes, daughter of Neill McInnes and Mary Reid, at Maybole, Ayrshire, Scotland.

John and Catherine McMaster immigrated to Queensland, Australia on the ship "William Miles" arriving January 1855  and became a freehold farmer at Melton Hill near Nundah.

John and Catherine McMaster had the following children:
 Isabella, born Queensland 1857
 John Neill, born Brisbane 1860, died Brisbane 1917
 Neill, born Brisbane 1862, died Brisbane 1895
 James, born Brisbane 1864
 Mary Jane, born Brisbane 1866, died Brisbane 1948
 Catherine, born Brisbane 1869
 Ellen, born Brisbane 1871
 Colin John Wesley, born Brisbane 1874, died Brisbane 1950

His wife Catherine died in Brisbane on Friday 24 January 1879 and was buried on Saturday 25 January 1879 in the Nundah Cemetery.

Following an illness of several months, John McMaster died at the home of his granddaughter at Kent Street, New Farm, Brisbane on Friday 29 February 1924 aged 93 years. He was buried on Saturday 1 March 1924 in the Nundah Cemetery.

Public life
John McMaster was an alderman of the Brisbane Municipal Council 1872–1874 and 1876–1899 and an alderman of the Brisbane City Council 1905–1921. He was mayor in 1884, 1890, 1893, 1897, and 1918–1919. He served on the following committees:
 Finance Committee 1872, 1874, 1876, 1878–1880, 1882, 1885, 1887, 1889, 1891, 1894, 1896, 1899, 1908, 1910, 1913, 1915, 1917, 1919
 Legislative Committee 1872–1874, 1879, 1881, 1883, 1884, 1886, 1887, 1890, 1891, 1894, 1896, 1899, 1906, 1907
 Improvement Committee 1873, 1877
 Works Committee 1883, 1884, 1886, 1887, 1890, 1892, 1893, 1895, 1897, 1898, 1906, 1907, 1909, 1911, 1912, 1914, 1918, 1919
 Health Committee 1884, 1892, 1893, 1895, 1897, 1898, 1905, 1911, 1913
 Street Lighting Committee 1891, 1893
 Parks Committee 1897, 1898, 1917, 1918, 1920–1921
 Building & Alignments of Roads Committee 1905–1908, 1913
 Special Sewerage Committee 1905, 1907
 Markets Committee 1907, 1908, 1910–1914
 General Purpose Committee 1910, 1912, 1915–1917
 Lightning Committee 1908, 1909
 Wharves Special Committee 1914–1918
 New Parks Special Committee 1914
 Parks Special Committee 1915
 Corporation Yard Special Committee 1916
 Town Hall Special Committee 1918
 City of Brisbane Incorporation Act Special Committee 1918
 Special Street War Names & Anzac Square Committee 1919

John McMaster was the Member of the Legislative Assembly of Queensland for the electorate of Fortitude Valley from 14 September 1885 to 11 March 1899 as a member of the Ministerialist party. John McMaster was appointed a Member of the Queensland Legislative Council on 9 May 1899 (a life appointment) but resigned on 22 July 1901 to stand again for election as a Member of the Legislative Assembly of Queensland. He was successful and served again as a Member of the Legislative Assembly for the electorate of Fortitude Valley from 3 August 1901 to 27 August 1904, again as a member of the Ministerialist party. He was elected again from 18 May 1907 to 5 February 1908 as a Member of the Legislative Assembly of Queensland for the electorate of Fortitude Valley as a member of the Opposition party.

See also
 List of mayors and lord mayors of Brisbane
 Photo of John McMaster, 1883

References

External links

Mayors and Lord Mayors of Brisbane
Members of the Queensland Legislative Assembly
Members of the Queensland Legislative Council
1830 births
1924 deaths
Burials at Nundah Cemetery
Pre-Separation Queensland